Joakim Reiter is the former Deputy Secretary-General of the United Nations Conference on Trade and Development. Prior to this appointment of 8 January 2015 by United Nations Secretary-General Ban Ki-moon, Reiter served as a Deputy Director General with the Ministry of Foreign Affairs of Sweden.

In addition to heading the Department for International Trade Policy with the Ministry of Foreign Affairs of Sweden, he held the positions of Ambassador and Permanent Representative of Sweden to the World Trade Organization and senior-level positions with the Swedish National Board of Trade.

On 13 March 2017, Vodafone appointed Reiter as Group External Affairs Director, effective 1 August 2017.

References

External links

Swedish officials of the United Nations
Living people
Year of birth missing (living people)